Jovan Popović (14 November 1810 – 25 September 1864) was a Serbian portrait painter.

Biography 
Popović was born in Opovo in Banat in 1810. From 1839 he lived in Belgrade. He was first taught painting by Konstantin Danil and later he pursued his academic studies in Vienna at the famed Academy of Fine Arts. His professors there were Joseph von Führich and Leopold Kupelwieser.

In 1845 he returned to Belgrade, but once there, unable to get commissions because they were being given to his professional rival Dimitrije Avramović, he decided to return to Opovo in Banat in late 1845 and marry his high school sweetheart. His best man was Jovan Sterija Popović.

He is credited to have painted the icons in the iconostasis of the St. Nicholas Serbian Orthodox Church in Dolovo, from 1853 to 1855. In the spirit of Biedermeier, Popović painted portraits of people, women, and children, members of the civilian population like his contemporary colleague Katarina Ivanović.

Legacy 
A school in Novi Sad is named after Popović.

Gallery

See also 
 List of painters from Serbia

References

External links 
 Bust of Jovan Popović by Olja Ivanjicki: Opovo - Jovan Popović - Painter 1810-1864. (Author Olja Ivanjicki)

1810 births
1864 deaths
19th-century Serbian painters
Serbian male painters
19th-century Austrian male artists
Academy of Fine Arts Vienna alumni
Austro-Hungarian painters
People from Opovo
19th-century Serbian male artists